The following outline is provided as an overview of and introduction to Aruba:

Aruba – Caribbean island nation that is a constituent country of the Kingdom of the Netherlands. A country within the Kingdom of the Netherlands, Aruba has no administrative subdivisions. Unlike much of the Caribbean region, Aruba has a dry climate and an arid, cactus-strewn landscape. This climate has helped tourism as visitors to the island can reliably expect warm sunny weather.

General reference

 Pronunciation:
 Common English country name: Aruba
 Official English country name: Aruba of the Kingdom of the Netherlands
 Common endonym(s):  
 Official endonym(s):  
 Adjectival(s): Aruban
 Demonym(s):
 ISO country codes: AW, ABW, 533
 ISO region codes: See ISO 3166-2:AW
 Internet country code top-level domain: .aw

Geography of Aruba 

Geography of Aruba
 Aruba is: an island, and a country of the Kingdom of the Netherlands
 Location:
 Northern Hemisphere and Western Hemisphere
 North America (just off the coast of South America, north of Venezuela)
 Atlantic Ocean
 Caribbean
 Antilles
 Lesser Antilles (island chain)
 Leeward Antilles
 Time zone:  Eastern Caribbean Time (UTC-04)
 High:  Mount Jamanota 
 Low:  Caribbean Sea 0 m
 Land boundaries:  none
 Coastline:  68.5 km
 Population of Aruba: 104,494 (2007) - 195th most populous country

 Area of Aruba: 
 Atlas of Aruba

Environment of Aruba 

 Climate of Aruba
 Wildlife of Aruba
 Fauna of Aruba
 Mammals of Aruba

Natural geographic features of Aruba 
 Islands of Aruba
 Rivers of Aruba
 World Heritage Sites in Aruba: None

Regions of Aruba

Administrative divisions of Aruba
None.

Demography of Aruba 

Demographics of Aruba

Government and politics of Aruba 

Politics of Aruba
 Form of government: constitutional monarchy and parliamentary representative democracy
 Capital of Aruba: Oranjestad
 Elections in Aruba
 Political parties in Aruba

Branches of government

Government of Aruba

Executive branch of the government of Aruba 
 Head of state: Monarchy of the Netherlands
 Her Majesty's representative: Governor of Aruba
 Head of government: Prime Minister of Aruba
 Cabinet: Council of Ministers of Aruba

Legislative branch of the government of Aruba 

 Parliament: Estates of Aruba (unicameral)

Judicial branch of the government of Aruba 

Court system of Aruba
 Court of first instance of Aruba

Foreign relations of Aruba 

Foreign relations of Aruba
 Diplomatic missions in Aruba
 Diplomatic missions of Aruba

International organization membership 
Aruba is a member of:

Caribbean Community and Common Market (Caricom) (observer)
International Criminal Police Organization (Interpol)
International Labour Organization (ILO)
International Monetary Fund (IMF)
International Olympic Committee (IOC)
International Trade Union Confederation (ITUC)

United Nations Educational, Scientific, and Cultural Organization (UNESCO) (associate)
Universal Postal Union (UPU)
World Confederation of Labour (WCL)
World Federation of Trade Unions (WFTU)
World Meteorological Organization (WMO)
World Tourism Organization (UNWTO) (associate)

In many other organizations (most notably the United Nations) the Kingdom of the Netherlands is a member acceding on behalf of all countries of the Kingdom.

Law and order in Aruba

 Capital punishment in Aruba
 Coast guard – Dutch Caribbean Coast Guard
 Constitution of Aruba
 Human rights in Aruba
 LGBT rights in Aruba
 Law enforcement in Aruba

Military of Aruba 

Military of Aruba
 Aruba is a protectorate of the Kingdom of the Netherlands, and has no defense forces of its own
 Forces
 Army of Aruba: None
 Navy of Aruba: None
 Air Force of Aruba: None
 Special forces of Aruba: None
 Military ranks of Aruba: None

History of Aruba 

History of Aruba

Culture of Aruba 

Culture of Aruba
 Festivals in Aruba
 Languages of Aruba
 National symbols of Aruba
 Coat of arms of Aruba
 Flag of Aruba
 National anthem of Aruba
 Religion in Aruba
 Islam in Aruba
 World Heritage Sites in Aruba: None
 National Library of Aruba
 List of monuments of Aruba

Art in Aruba 
 Music of Aruba

Sports in Aruba 

 Football in Aruba
 Aruba at the Olympics

Economy and infrastructure of Aruba 

Economy of Aruba
 Economic rank, by nominal GDP (2007): 154th (one hundred and fifty fourth)
 Communications in Aruba
 Internet in Aruba
Currency of Aruba: Florin
ISO 4217: AWG
 Aruba Stock Exchange
 Transport in Aruba
 Airports in Aruba
 Rail transport in Aruba

Education in Aruba 
 Colegio Arubano
 International School of Aruba

See also

Aruba

Index of Aruba-related articles
List of international rankings
Outline of geography
Outline of North America
Outline of South America
Outline of the Caribbean
Outline of the Netherlands

References

External links

 Government
 Government of Aruba
 Central Bank of Aruba
 Central Bureau of Statistics Aruba
 Aruba Ports Authority
 Department of Economic Affairs, Commerce and Industry of Aruba
 Aruba Airport Authority
 Aruba Health Insurance (AZV)
 Aruba.com - Governmental Tourism Portal

 Other

 University of Aruba
 A Cruisers Guide to Aruba
 Aruba Paper Money

Aruba
Aruba